Skateboarding at the 2019 Southeast Asian Games was held in Tagaytay, Philippines from 3 to 8 December 2019. This edition marks the first time that skateboarding was contested in the regional games.

Schedule

Source: 2019 Sea Games

Participation
Seven nations will participate in skateboarding events of the 2019 Southeast Asian Games.

 
 
 
 
 
 
 

As host the Philippines can send two athletes per event. An athlete representing any nation can only participate in at most two events.

Medal summary

Men

Women

Medal table

References

External links
  
 Bulletin Southeast Asian Games 2019 Skateboarding - General Information at World Skate

2019 Southeast Asian Games events
2019 in roller sports